Kampenes Station was a railway station on the Eastern Østfold Line located at Kampenes in Sarpsborg, Norway. Situated  from Oslo Central Station (Oslo S), it featured a simple platform. The station was located next to a large park and ride facility. The station was opened on 19 May 1990 and was only used that year. It was only served during sporting events with shuttle trains operating to Rudskogen Motorsenter Station which served the motorsport venue Rudskogen.

History
Rudskogen Motorsenter was the first asphalt circuit built in Eastern Norway and was officially opened in May 1990. The stations were first used on the 19 and 20 May, with the Norwegian State Railways operating a shuttle service between Kampenes and Rudskogen. This was not a success and both stations were abandoned after the 1990 season. The stations was never used by scheduled trains. The same season NSB also opened Hauge Station between Fredrikstad and Sarpsborg in order to serve  the sports venue Østfoldhallen.

Facilities
The station was situated on the Eastern Østfold Line,  from Oslo S. The station was situated along a section of single track and only featured a simple platform.

References
 

Railway stations in Østfold
Railway stations on the Østfold Line
Disused railway stations in Norway
Railway stations opened in 1990
Railway stations closed in 1990
1990 establishments in Norway
1990 disestablishments in Norway
Sarpsborg